The men's 20 kilometres walk event at the 2017 Summer Universiade was held on 26 August on Ren'ai Road, Taipei City.

Medalists

Individual

Team

Results

Individual

Penalties
~ Lost contact
> Bent knee

Team

References

Walk
2017